Brewster's Millions is a lost 1921 American comedy film starring Fatty Arbuckle. It is an adaptation of the 1902 novel written by George Barr McCutcheon as well as the 1906 Broadway smash hit play of the same name starring Edward Abeles.

Plot
As summarized in a film publication, Monte Brewster's (Arbuckle) two grandfathers, one rich and the other a self-made man, squabble as to the way the infant should be raised. The mother steps in and decides to raise the child her way, which results in Monte being a clerk in a steamship office at the age of 21. At this point the grandfathers get together again, with one grandfather giving him $1 million, and the other offering $4 million provided that at the end of one year Monte spends the $1 million given by the other grandfather. Other conditions include that he be absolutely "broke" at the end of one year, that he not marry for five years, and not to tell any one of the arrangement. Young Brewster tries everything he can to get rid of the money, but everything he does and the wildest chances he takes result in more money for him. He hires three men to help him spend the money, but they take too much interest in investing it wisely. They hire Peggy Gray (Clarke) for a position in Monte's office to manage his affairs so that he will not lose his money. Peggy purchases some mines in Peru and a ship Monte has hired for a pleasure cruise is used to go to Peru, but they never get there. They rescue a ship in distress and then are forced to turn back. At the last minute, Monte is dead broke but married to Peggy. But the salvage on the ship Monte rescued brings him $2 million, and the Peruvian government extends the time for working the mines, so everything ends happy.

Cast

See also
 Fatty Arbuckle filmography
 Brewster's Millions (film), other film adaptations of the novel

References

External links

1921 films
1921 comedy films
1921 lost films
Silent American comedy films
American black-and-white films
American silent feature films
American films based on plays
Films directed by Joseph Henabery
Films based on American novels
Films based on adaptations
Films based on Brewster's Millions
Films based on multiple works
Lost American films
Lost comedy films
1920s American films
1920s English-language films